is a junction railway station in the city of  Yonezawa, Yamagata, Japan, operated by East Japan Railway Company (JR East).

Lines
Yonezawa Station is served by the Ōu Main Line and the Yamagata Shinkansen, and is located 40.1 kilometers from the starting point of both lines at Fukushima Station.

Station layout
Yonezawa Station is an elevated station with one partial bay platform used for tracks 1, 4 and 5 and one island platform, serving tracks 2 and 3. The station has a Midori no Madoguchi staffed ticket office.

Platforms

History
Yonezawa Station opened on 15 May 1899. The station was absorbed into the JR East network upon the privatization of JNR on 1 April 1987. The Yamagata Shinkansen began operations from 1 July 1992. A new station building was completed in November 1993.

Passenger statistics
In fiscal 2018, the station was used by an average of 2389 passengers daily (boarding passengers only).

Surrounding area
 
 
Yonezawa City Hall
Yonezawa Post Office
 Uesugi Shrine 
 Yonezawa Women's Junior College

Famous Ekiben
 Gyukakuni bento - black beef served inside a container shaped like a cow's face; when the lid is removed Hanagasa Ondo is played

See also
List of Railway Stations in Japan

References

External links

 JR East station information 

Stations of East Japan Railway Company
Yamagata Shinkansen
Railway stations in Yamagata Prefecture
Yonesaka Line
Ōu Main Line
Railway stations in Japan opened in 1899
Yonezawa, Yamagata